March or Die may refer to:
March ör Die, a Motörhead album, or its title track
March or Die (film), a 1977 film directed by Dick Richards, starring Gene Hackman, Terence Hill, Catherine Deneuve and Ian Holm